The Pentagon is an album by pianist Cedar Walton recorded in 1976 and released on the Japanese East Wind label.

Reception

Allmusic awarded the album 4 stars calling it "Superior to Walton's RCA recordings of the period and his upcoming output for Columbia, this obscure effort finds all of the musicians playing up to their usual level of creativity".

Track listing 
 "Manteca" (Dizzy Gillespie, Chano Pozo, Gil Fuller) - 5:53   
 "Darn That Dream" (Jimmy Van Heusen, Eddie DeLange) - 5:14   
 "Una Mas" (Kenny Dorham) - 5:12   
 "D. B. Blues" (Lester Young) - 4:35   
 "I Can't Get Started" (Ira Gershwin, Vernon Duke) - 5:34   
 "He is a Hero" (Clifford Jordan) - 4:56

Personnel 
Cedar Walton - piano 
Clifford Jordan - tenor saxophone
Sam Jones - bass
Billy Higgins - drums
Ray Mantilla - congas

References 

Cedar Walton albums
1976 albums
East Wind Records albums